Government Engineering College, Vaishali (GEC Vaishali) is a technical institute established in 2018 by the Government of Bihar under the Department of Science and Technology, Bihar. It is approved by AICTE and is affiliated with Aryabhatta Knowledge University. The institute offers full-time Bachelor of Technology (B.Tech) degree programs. It started its first academic session (2018–19) in temporary campus from the campus of Government Polytechnic College, Vaishali. The institute offers full-time Bachelor of Technology (B.Tech) degree programs in disciplines of science and technology. The Permanent building is to be built by 2nd week of April 2022 near Bidupur, Hajipur, Vaishali.

Departments 
GEC Vaishali offers undergraduate courses in four streams of engineering:

Admission 
Till 2018: The Bihar Combined Entrance Competitive Examination Board(BCECEB) conducts an exam based on the Merit List of the Bihar Combined Entrance Competitive Examination  successful candidates appear in the counseling at the allotted college during online counseling procedure

From 2019 onwards admissions in state engineering colleges of Bihar will be based on JEE mains rank. Students have to fill the application form on the BCECE Board website for admission.

Campus and location 
GEC Vaishali Temporary campus is located at Government Polytechnic Campus, Fatehpur, Afzalpur Road, Pochakmaruf, Goraul, Vaishali, Bihar – 844118. Permanent campus to be shifted by 25th MAY at chaksikandar, Hajipur, Vaishali

See also 

 List of institutions of higher education in Bihar
 Aryabhatta Knowledge University
 Education in Patna
 Education in Bihar
 Education in India

References

External links 
 
Facebook page
Instagram Profile

Engineering colleges in Vaishali
Colleges affiliated to Aryabhatta Knowledge University
Engineering colleges in Bihar
2018 establishments in Bihar
Educational institutions established in 2018